Kallir is a surname. Notable people with this surname include:

Eleazar Kallir, Eleazar ben Killir  (c. 570 – c. 640),  Byzantine Jew and a Hebrew poet 
Jane Kallir, American art dealer, curator and author
Lilian Kallir, Czech-born American pianist
Otto Kallir,  Austrian American art historian, author, publisher